David and the Phoenix is a 1957 children's novel about a young boy's adventures with a phoenix. It was the first published book by American children's writer Edward Ormondroyd.

Premise
The story focusses on the friendship between the protagonist, David, and the phoenix. David is taught the ways of the mythical world.

Plot summary
David moves to a new house at the base of some beautiful mountains. The next day, rather than settle into the new house, he decides to climb the mountains. Upon reaching the summit, he encounters the Phoenix. They are, at first, frightened of each other, as the Phoenix had been chased by a scientist for several weeks and David had, of course, never seen anything like the Phoenix before. The Phoenix is flattered by David's attentions, though, and decides to educate David about the legendary creatures in the world.

The first adventure in the Phoenix's curriculum for David involves seeing the Gryffins. They first meet a witch who goads the Phoenix into a race. They are captured by the arrogant Gryffons, who sentence the Phoenix to death for bringing humans into their magic world.

They escape and the Phoenix keeps his appointment with the witch. David returns home to meet the unpleasant scientist visiting his parents. The two friends implement plans to avoid the scientist, firstly by finding some buried treasure with the help of a gruff but friendly sea monster, and spending the gold coins on magic items to foil the scientist's plot to capture the rare bird.

While visiting the magical world to buy necessities, David has a brief adventure with a prankster Leprechaun, meets a cantankerous potion-selling hag, and a faun. The Phoenix rescues David from remaining too long in this world, which could absorb those beings who are not magical.

The Phoenix and David sabotage the scientist's equipment and frighten him into leaving town. The old Phoenix celebrates his 500th birthday, and soon reveals he must "bow to tradition," and build himself a pyre of cinnamon logs. David tearfully complies with his friend's wishes, buying the necessary items from town.

The Scientist shows up and follows David up the mountain trails. The Phoenix is reborn, but as a hatchling, does not yet comprehend its peril. David appeals to the young Phoenix, who dimly recognizes a friend, and flies away to avoid capture. David watches as the old Phoenix's feather changes from blue to gold.

Characters
David – the protagonist, full of curiosity. He begins the story fascinated by the mountain and learns much about life from his adventures with the Phoenix.
The Phoenix – a mythical bird with a steak of arrogance. The Phoenix is wise and cares about David. 
Scientist – The antagonist, seeks to capture the Phoenix for experimentation.

Publication Background

Ormandroyd attended UC Berkeley on the G.I. Bill, taking a Bachelor's degree in English and a masters in Library Science (MLIS). Adopting  a largely bohemian lifestyle with his roommates, Ormandroyd remembered his college years as “one of the happiest times of my life.”

After graduating, Ormandroyd was disinclined to pursue a career in academia, preferring to seek various blue-collar jobs. Describing his employment history as “hopelessly mixed in my memory” Ormandroyd worked for a number of  industrial enterprises, including a paper processing plant in the Berkeley area, as well as an able-bodied seaman on oil tankers that serviced operations in Alaska and Hawaii. Living in the Berkeley area, Ormandroyd briefly clerked in a bookstore and was “writing not-very-good stories and keeping a journal...It will be no surprise that after library school [MSL] I got a job as a librarian.”

Ormandroyd’s literary magnum opus emerged at college where he first conceived the plot and characters for David and the Phoenix. Ormandroyd reports that “I’m still surprised that it happened. It was as if the choice made me rather than the other way around.”

Chef-d'œuvre:  David and the Phoenix

The origins and inspiration for his fantasy character the Phoenix were recalled by Ormandroyd in 2011:

Ormandroyd, familiar with the Legend of the Phoenix. attributes his “vision” to a number of literary influences, among them T. H. White’s adventure The Sword in the Stone (1938), while the personality of the Phoenix may have had its origin in the “pompous” Major Hoople, featured in the newspaper cartoon Our Boarding House. David’s adventurous travels perched on the mythical bird’s back were drawn from The Wonderful Adventures of Nils (1907) by Selma Lagerlöf.

Ormandroyd admits that he never documented the precise chronology of his “seven-year” effort writing David and the Phoenix, from its inception in college to its publication by the Follett Publishing Company in 1957, which entailed numerous rejections by publishers, Follett among them initially. During these years, Ormandroyd subsisted in part on his stipend provided under the GI bill.

His agent and editor Muriel Fuller coached Ormandroyd in writing a “leaner” and “better” version of the book.

David and the Phoenix reached a wide audience when it was included in Weekly Reader Book Club and was awarded the silver medal for best juvenile story of 1957.

Developments

This book enjoyed a resurgence of popularity early in the 2000s in the wake of Harry Potter and the filming of Roald Dahl novels. As of October 2005, there had been negotiations between the author and a private animation-film company to produce a feature-length "David and the Phoenix" screen adaptation. 

In 2002 Full Cast Audio released an unabridged recording of the novel read by a cast of ten actors and Ormondroyd as the narrator. The production was hailed by AudioFile magazine, which said, "Every line of the book's warmth, humor, and gentleness comes to life in [Full Cast founder] Bruce Coville's superb multicast production."

David Weber used the book as a recurring motif in the Honor Harrington novel At All Costs (2005), with a brief footnote about his own childhood love for the book. The original cover of At All Costs shows Honor Harrington reading from David and the Phoenix to her infant son Raoul. Weber's 2010 novel Out of the Dark also mentions the book as a favorite of one of the main characters' children.

Trivia
A 1967 Dark Shadows storyline featuring Laura Collins (Diana Millay), apparently a woman, but in actuality a phoenix, who tries to lay claim to a nine-year-old boy named David. Fans had speculated that this might have been inspired by the book. Writer Malcolm Marmorstein has not, to date, been asked about this.

Release details
 1957, US, Follett Publishing Company, October 1, 1957, hardcover
 1958, US, Follett, Weekly Reader Children's Book Club edition 
 At Project Gutenberg: index; title page verso (v of viii+173+2); final image.
1981, US, Scholastic Paperbacks, June 1981, paperback
 2000, US, Purple House Press, September 2000, hardback
2001, US, Purple House Press, January 2001, paperback
2001, US, Purple House Press, July 2001, hardcover
2002, US, Full Cast Audio, unabridged recording
 2007, Playaway edition (playawaydigital.com) of the Full Cast Audio production, May 2007
Year unknown, US, Scholastic Paperbacks, paperback

Notes

References

Noblemania, 2001. First-Ever Interview with Edward Ormondroyd.  Noblemania.com Saturday, October 15, 2011, parts 1 and 2 (click to part 2). https://www.noblemania.com/2011/10/first-ever-interview-with-edward.html Retrieved 4 July 2022.

External links

 
 

1957 American novels
1957 children's books
American children's novels
American fantasy novels
Children's fantasy novels
Phoenixes in popular culture